Alan Green (born 1 January 1954) is a former professional footballer. Born in England, he began his career with Coventry City before moving to the United States in 1979. He played a total of seven seasons in the North American Soccer League and earned one cap with the U.S. national team.

Professional

In England
Green, a native of Worcester, England, began his professional career with Coventry City. He joined the club as a striker in 1970, but did not make his first team debut until 22 April 1972, which was his only appearance during that season. He peaked with the club during the 1975–76 season when he played 31 games and scored nine goals. After that his appearances and goals slowly began to taper off.

In United States
In 1977, Coventry loaned Green to the Washington Diplomats (Dips) of the North American Soccer League (NASL), whose season ran during the summer months, or the English off-season. Green played 16 games, scoring nine goals and assisting on five others. At the end of the 1978-79 English season, Green left Coventry to move permanently to the NASL, rejoining the Diplomats for the next two years. Green became a prolific scorer with the Dips, finding the net 42 times in 56 games, earning NASL All-Star Honorable Mention honours for 1980.

At the end of the 1980 season, the Dips sold Green to the Jacksonville Tea Men; he spent two seasons with the Tea Men. In his first season, Green again gained NASL All Star Honorable Mention; in 1982, however, he bagged only six goals on 18 games. At the end of the season, the Tea Men traded Green to the San Jose Earthquakes. He played the 1982-1983 NASL indoor season with the Earthquakes, scoring seven goals.

In 1983, U.S. Soccer entered the United States national team, as Team America, into the NASL. The team drew on American citizens playing in the NASL, Major Indoor Soccer League and American Soccer League. However, both the USSF and the NASL quickly discovered that many top American players preferred to remain with their existing clubs. In order to fill the roster, U.S. Soccer was forced to draw on foreign imports, and it negotiated with the Earthquakes to loan Green to Team America, despite the fact that he was still a British subject. Team America's 1983 season was a disaster, with a league-worst 10–20 record and dwindling attendance figures; the club folded at season's end. Green then became a free agent and signed with the New York Cosmos as the team prepared for the 1983-84 NASL indoor season. Green received his American citizenship in November 1983, and played with the Cosmos through the indoor season, the subsequent 1984 outdoor season, and finally the club's 1984-85 indoor season in the Major Indoor Soccer League. In 1985, just as the NASL was collapsing, Green retired as a player.

U.S. National Team
Once Green gained U.S. citizenship, he earned a single cap with the United States national team in a 30 May 1984, scoreless tie with Italy. He started, but came off for Perry Van der Beck.

References

External links
Coventry Bio
NASL/MISL stats

1954 births
Living people
American soccer players
Association football forwards
Coventry City F.C. players
English emigrants to the United States
English footballers
English expatriate footballers
Jacksonville Tea Men players
Major Indoor Soccer League (1978–1992) players
North American Soccer League (1968–1984) indoor players
New York Cosmos players
New York Cosmos (MISL) players
North American Soccer League (1968–1984) players
Golden Bay Earthquakes (MISL) players
Team America (NASL) players
United States men's international soccer players
Washington Diplomats (NASL) players
English expatriate sportspeople in the United States
Expatriate soccer players in the United States